Sunday Kolawole Afolabi (born 10 July 1999) is a Nigerian Association football who plays as a midfielder for Malaysia Super League club Perak.

Career

Before the 2017 season, Afolabi signed for Nigerian second tier side Osun United. Before the 2018 season, he signed for Rivers United in the Nigerian top flight. Before the 2019 season, Afolabi signed for Peruvian club San Martín, where he made 26 league appearances and scored 2 goals. On 16 February 2019, he debuted for San Martín during a 1–1 draw with UTC. On 24 March 2019, Afolabi scored his first goal for San Martín during a 1–0 win over Mannucci.

Before the second half of 2020–21, he signed for Leiria in Portugal. In 2021, Afolabi signed for Slovak second tier team Púchov. Before the second half of 2021–22, he signed for Žižkov B in the Czech fifth tier.

Honours

Individual
 Fallon d'Floor': 2022

References

External links
 

1999 births
2. Liga (Slovakia) players
Association football midfielders
Campeonato de Portugal (league) players
Club Deportivo Universidad de San Martín de Porres players
Expatriate footballers in the Czech Republic
Expatriate footballers in Peru
Expatriate footballers in Portugal
Expatriate footballers in Slovakia
Living people
MŠK Púchov players
Nigeria Professional Football League players
Nigerian expatriate footballers
Nigerian expatriate sportspeople in the Czech Republic
Nigerian expatriate sportspeople in Portugal
Nigerian expatriate sportspeople in Slovakia
Nigerian footballers
Peruvian Primera División players
Osun United F.C. players
Rivers United F.C. players
U.D. Leiria players
Perak F.C. players